Luc Frieden (born 16 September 1963) is a Luxembourgish politician and lawyer. He held cabinet positions in the Luxembourgish government between 1998 and 2013. Frieden was president of the Luxembourgish Chamber of Commerce and Eurochambres, the business federation of European Chambers of Commerce and Industry. 

In early 2023, he was elected to be the lead candidate of the Luxembourg Christian Democrats (CSV - EPP) for the general elections in October.

Early life and education

Luc Frieden completed high school in his home country Luxembourg and received thereafter an international university education in France, the UK and the US. He graduated in business law from Université Paris 1 Panthéon-Sorbonne. He obtained a master's degree in comparative law from the University of Cambridge (UK) and a further Master of Laws Degree from Harvard Law School. While at Harvard, he was also cross registered at Harvard Kennedy School.

Besides Luxembourgish, he speaks fluently English, German, French and has a good working knowledge of Dutch.

Political career

In 1994, Frieden was elected to the Chamber of Deputies of Luxembourg for the Christian Democrats (CSV - EPP), becoming, at the age of thirty, the then youngest member of the House. While in Parliament, he chaired the Finance Committee as well as the Constitutional Committee and was a leading figure in the process leading to the establishment of a constitutional court and of independent administrative courts in Luxembourg.

In 1998, he became, at the age of thirty-four, Minister of Justice in the Government led by Prime Minister Jean-Claude Juncker. He also served as Minister for the Treasury and Budget from 1998 to 2009, as Minister of Defence from 2004 to 2006 and Minister of Finance from 2009 to 2013.

In the capacity of Minister for the Treasury and Budget, Frieden was responsible for the successful introduction of the euro as replacement for the Luxembourgish franc. During the Luxembourg Presidency of the Council of the European Union in 2005, he chaired the European Council of Ministers of Justice and Home Affairs (JHA). As Minister of Finance he represented his country at the European Council of Ministers of Economic and Financial Affairs (ECOFIN) as well as at the Eurogroup and participated in the stabilization of the Eurozone and the shaping of the European banking union. For 15 years, Frieden served as Governor of the World Bank and acted as chairman of the Board of Governors of the International Monetary Fund and the World Bank Group in 2013.

After politics 

Frieden joined Deutsche Bank as Vice Chairman in September 2014. Based in London he advised the management board and senior management on strategic aspects related to international and European affairs. He also served as chairman of the supervisory board of Deutsche Bank Luxembourg. He left Deutsche Bank in early 2016 to become chairman of the Board of Directors of Banque Internationale à Luxembourg (BIL), Luxembourg's oldest private universal bank. He was also chairman of the Board of Directors of the Luxembourg media group Saint Paul, the owner of the leading Luxembourg newspaper Luxemburger Wort, between 2016 and 2019. Next to his board positions, Luc Frieden is a partner with the Luxembourgish law firm Elvinger Hoss Prussen since 2016.

Between 2019 and 2023, Luc Frieden was also President of the Luxembourg Chamber of Commerce. In 2022, he also took over the Presidency of Eurochambres, the business federation of European Chambers of Commerce and Industry.

Following his comeback to politics in 2023, Frieden announced that he would resign from all his professional activities. He was elected to be the lead candidate of the Luxembourg Christian Democrats for the upcoming nationals elections in October.

References

|-

|-

1963 births
Alumni of the Athénée de Luxembourg
Christian Social People's Party politicians
Living people
20th-century Luxembourgian lawyers
Ministers for Defence of Luxembourg
Ministers for Finances of Luxembourg
Ministers for Justice of Luxembourg
Members of the Chamber of Deputies (Luxembourg) from Centre
People from Esch-sur-Alzette
Harvard Law School alumni